Wolsey is a heritage British clothing brand founded in 1755, making it one of the oldest existing textile companies in the world. The brand sells men's clothing and accessories, including a range of knitwear, socks, underwear and scarves. The company holds a Royal Warrant and is based in Leicester, England, where it was originally established. The company name, adopted in 1920 when R Walker & Sons merged with W Tyler and Sons, is a reference to Cardinal Wolsey. 'Wolsey' is a registered trademark.

History

The earliest records relating to the Wolsey business show that Henry Wood was trading in Leicester as a hosier in 1744.  Several years later, in 1748 he went into partnership with a man named Job Middleton and they were later joined by John Wrightman in 1750. 
 
Around 1755 Henry Wood dissolved the partnership as he wished to start his own business. Wood died in 1768 and the business was carried on by his widow, and later by his sons and grandsons, under the name of Ann Wood & Sons. In 1842, after the retirement of the last Wood family member, the name was changed to R Walker & Sons.

In 1920, R Walker & Sons merged with W Tyler and Sons. As the business was situated near to Leicester Abbey, the burial place of Cardinal Wolsey, the business established the trading name of 'Wolsey' and as such became one of the first brand names. The company began to trade directly with retailers rather than through a wholesale network, the standard business pattern at the time. It also employed travelling salesmen to service retail accounts and advertised its products across the world. As a result, Wolsey became a household name and in 1935 the Company was awarded its first Royal Warrant.

In the 1960s the company was forced to seek a merger as a result of massive changes in the retail world and became part of Courtaulds. After leaving the Courtauld group, the company was taken over by the Matalan group in 2002. Fergus Patterson was appointed managing director in January 2009.

Products
The company mainly manufactures menswear clothing such as underwear, socks, knitwear and shirts.

References

Further reading
Bramwell G Rudd
COURTAULDS and the HOSIERY & KNITWEAR INDUSTRY
(Carnegie Publishing Ltd) (2014, ISBN softback 978-1-905472-06-2, hardback 978-1-905472-18-5)

External links

1755 establishments in England
Textile companies of the United Kingdom
British Royal Warrant holders
Clothing companies of England
Knitwear manufacturers
Manufacturing companies established in 1755
British companies established in 1755